Agarda is a village and a panchayat in Khategaon tehsil of Dewas district in the Indian state of Madhya Pradesh. As of the 2011 Census of India, the village had a population of 907 spread over 161 households.

References 

Villages in Dewas district